The Ghazi Amanullah Khan Regional One Day Tournament is a cricket tournament organized by the Afghanistan Cricket Board (ACB) that forms part of the Afghanistan domestic cricket season. Starting from the 2017 season, following announcements from the ICC earlier in the same year, the tournament is recognized with List A status. The first ever domestic List A matches played in Afghanistan took place at the start of the 2017 edition of the Ghazi Amanullah Khan Regional One Day Tournament on 10 August 2017 at Khost Cricket Stadium, Khost. It is named after Afghan King Amanullah Khan. The winner of the first tournament was Spin Ghar Region.

Teams
The Ghazi Amanullah Khan Regional One Day Tournament features the eight regional sides of Afghanistan, each of which represents a number of provinces. Kabul Region, the sixth side that features in Afghanistan's first-class (Ahmad Shah Abdali 4-day Tournament) and Twenty20 (Shpageeza Cricket League) tournaments did not compete in the one-day tournament in 2017. In 2021, two new sides, Hindukush Region and Pamir Region were added.

See also
Afghanistan Cricket Board
Cricket in Afghanistan

References

External links
Official website of Afghanistan Cricket Board
info about Afghan Domestic cricket.

 
Cricket in Afghanistan
Afghan domestic cricket competitions
List A cricket competitions
2017 establishments in Afghanistan
Recurring sporting events established in 2017